The Honda Spirior is a mid-size sedan produced by Honda. It was introduced in 2009.

First generation (2009) 

The first generation Spirior was a badge-engineered version of the Japanese and European eighth generation Accord/Acura TSX. Production started in August 2009 in China, by Dongfeng Honda. At the same time, the North American and Asia Pacific version of the eighth generation Accord was marketed as the Honda Accord in China and produced by Honda’s joint venture with Chinese automaker GAC.

Second generation (2015) 
The Spirior concept was revealed at the 2014 Beijing Auto Show previewing the production model exclusive to China by the end of 2014. It is produced by Honda’s joint venture with Dongfeng and sold exclusively in the Chinese market. It was replaced in late 2018 by the sixth generation Inspire, which is a rebadged tenth generation Accord.

References 

Spirior
Cars introduced in 2009
2010s cars
Mid-size cars
Sedans
Front-wheel-drive vehicles
Cars of China